Mordellistena cymbalistria is a beetle in the genus Mordellistena of the family Mordellidae. It was described in 1925 by Paul de Peyerimhoff de Fontenelle.

References

cymbalistria
Beetles described in 1925